The 1887 New York Athletic Club football team was an American football team that represented the New York Athletic Club in their inaugural season with the American Football Union.  The team compiled a 2–2 record (1–2 in the AFU) and were outscored by their opponents by a total of 24 to 18.

Schedule

References

New York Athletic Club
New York Athletic Club football seasons
New York Athletic Club football team